Achmad Iqbal Bachtiar (born 2 May 1998) is an Indonesian professional footballer who plays as a goalkeeper for Liga 2 club Semen Padang.

Club career

Semen Padang
He was signed for Semen Padang to play in Liga 2 in the 2018 season.

Honours

Club 
Semen Padang
 Liga 2 runner-up: 2018

References

External links
 Achmad Iqbal Bachtiar at Soccerway
 Achmad Iqbal Bachtiar at Liga Indonesia

1998 births
Living people
Indonesian footballers
Association football goalkeepers
Semen Padang F.C. players